Richard William Waddell (May 16, 1922 – October 27, 2016) was an American politician in the state of South Dakota. He was a member of the South Dakota State Senate, representing the 22nd district (1983–84) and the 27th district (1984–90). He was a real estate broker and rancher.

References

1922 births
2016 deaths
Democratic Party South Dakota state senators
People from Cherry County, Nebraska
People from Dewey County, South Dakota